Sodium metabisulfite or sodium pyrosulfite (IUPAC spelling; Br. E. sodium metabisulphite or sodium pyrosulphite) is an inorganic compound of chemical formula Na2S2O5.  The substance is sometimes referred to as disodium metabisulfite.  It is used as a disinfectant, antioxidant, and preservative agent. When dissolved in water it forms sodium bisulfite.

Preparation

Sodium metabisulfite can be prepared by treating a solution of sodium hydroxide with sulfur dioxide.  When conducted in warm water, Na2SO3 initially precipitates as a yellow solid.  With more SO2, the solid dissolves to give the disulfite, which crystallises upon cooling.  
SO2  +  2 NaOH  →  Na2SO3  +  H2O
SO2 +  Na2SO3 →  Na2S2O5
which yields a residue of colourless solid Na2S2O5.

Chemical structure
The anion metabisulfite consists of an SO2 group linked to an SO3 group, with the negative charge more localised on the SO3 end.  The S–S bond length is 2.22 Å, and the "thionate" and "thionite" S–O distances are 1.46 and 1.50 Å, respectively.

Reactivity

Upon dissolution in water, bisulfite is generated:
Na2S2O5  +  H2O   →   2 Na+ + 2 HSO3−

Uses 
Sodium and potassium metabisulfite have many major and niche uses. It is widely used for preserving food and beverages.
Sodium metabisulfite is added as an excipient to medications which contain adrenaline (epinephrine), in order to prevent the oxidation of adrenaline. For example, it is added to combination drug formulations which contain a local anaesthetic and adrenaline, and to the formulation in epinephrine autoinjectors, such as the EpiPen. This lengthens the shelf life of the formulation, although the sodium metabisulphite reacts with adrenaline, causing it to degrade and form epinephrine sulphonate.
In combination with sodium hydrosulfite it is used as a rust-stain remover
It is used in photography.
Concentrated sodium metabisulfite can be used to remove tree stumps. Some brands contain 98% sodium metabisulfite, and cause degradation of lignin in the stumps, facilitating removal.
It is also used as an excipient in some tablets, such as paracetamol. 
A very important health related aspect of this substance is that it can be added to a blood smear in a test for sickle cell anaemia (and other similar forms of haemoglobin mutation). The substance causes defunct cells to sickle (through a complex polymerisation) hence confirming disease.
It is used as a bleaching agent in the production of coconut cream
It (or liquid SO2) is commonly used as an antimicrobial and antioxidant in winemaking; bottled wine indicates its use with the label "Contains Sulfites" in the US.
It is used as a reducing agent to break sulfide bonds in shrunken items of clothing made of natural fibres, thus allowing the garment to go back to its original shape after washing
It is used as a SO2 source (mixed with air or oxygen) for the destruction of cyanide in commercial gold cyanidation processes.
It is used as a SO2 source (mixed with air or oxygen) for the precipitation of elemental gold in chloroauric (aqua regia) solutions.
It is used in the water treatment industry to quench residual chlorine.
It is used in tint etching iron-based metal samples for microstructural analysis.
It is used as a fungicide for anti-microbe and mould prevention during shipping of consumer goods such as shoes and clothing. Plastic stickers and packaging (such as Micro-Pak™) containing the anhydrous, sodium metabisulfite solid active ingredient are added prior to shipping. The devices absorb moisture from the atmosphere during shipping and release low levels of sulfur dioxide.
It is used for preserving fruit during shipping.
It is used as a solvent in the extraction of starch from tubers, fruit, and cereal crops.
It is used as a pickling agent to treat high pressure reverse osmosis and nanofiltration water desalination membranes for extended storage periods between uses.

Safety 
Sodium metabisulfite, despite not being flammable, decomposes in 150°C  of heat releasing toxic gasses when decomposed. It is corrosive when dissolved in water.

Harmful if swallowed, it is corrosive to metals and should be stored safely.

References

External links
International Chemical Safety Card 1461
The surprisingly elusive crystal structure of sodium metabisulfite
CDC - NIOSH Pocket Guide to Chemical Hazards

Metabisulfites
Sodium compounds
Food additives
Disinfectants
Homebrewing
E-number additives